Martin Bergman (born 17 June 1957) is a British producer, writer and director who works in Hollywood.

He studied English at Emmanuel College, Cambridge from 1976, and was president of Cambridge Footlights during his time there. After leaving Cambridge University in 1979, Bergman produced several live arena shows with his Australian partner Michael Edgley, including the world tour of ice skaters Torvill and Dean. He also produced several comedy shows in Australia, Britain and the USA.

Bergman married the American comedian Rita Rudner in 1988. They have written several films, plays and TV projects together. In January 2016, Rudner appeared in a new play Act 3... alongside Charles Shaughnessy at the Laguna Playhouse, directed by Martin. Bergman has also directed some of these projects, and Bergman's company has produced many of his wife's shows, most notably her Las Vegas residency which sold almost two million tickets over a multi-year run. They have a daughter Molly and the three of them divide their time between homes in Las Vegas and Southern California.

References

External links

Alumni of the University of Cambridge
1957 births
Living people
British theatre directors
British theatre managers and producers